Jason Teh Jia Heng (born 25 August 2000) is a Singaporean badminton player. He won a bronze medal for Singapore as part of the team at the 2022 Badminton Asia Team Championships and 2021 Southeast Asian Games.

Early life 
Teh was born in Penang, Malaysia on 25 August 2000. He started playing badminton when he was four and moved to Singapore to study when he was 11. Teh eventually enrolled in the Singapore Sports School and joined the Singapore badminton national team at 17.

Career 
Teh won the bronze medal as he was in the Men's team at the 2019 Southeast Asian Games, where Singapore finished bronze medalists.

In 2021, he achieved two runner-up positions at the Polish International and the Bahrain International. He was also a semifinalist at the Czech Open.

In February 2022, he and his team were semifinalists at the Badminton Asia Team Championships.

In early May 2022, Jason played as the 2nd men singles for the Singaporean Squad at the Thomas Cup. In the first group match against Indonesia, Teh lost to Jonatan Christie in straight games, 19–21, 13–21. Singapore eventually lost 1–4 overall.

The next day, during Singapore's group match against South Korea, Teh was playing against Jeon Hyeok-jin. When Teh was 14–7 up in the first set, he slipped and injured his right foot, which required immediate treatment. Teh got up and started to play again, winning the first set 21–14. During the 2nd set, at 1–3 down, Teh twisted his right foot, adding a 2nd injury to his right leg. Teh eventually lost the 2nd and 3rd sets, thus losing the match 21–14, 13–21, 14–21. Singapore narrowly lost 2–3 overall in the group match, which meant that Singapore did not advance to the group stage.

Two days later, in the final group match against Thailand, Jason played against Adulrach Namkul. He lost in rubber games, 21–23, 21–14, 17–21. Singapore ended its 3rd Thomas Cup campaign by losing 2–3 to Thailand.

1 week later, Teh was in the Men's team and the Men's singles event at the 2021 Southeast Asian Games, entering the semifinals of the men's team In the Individual event, he got into the semifinals by beating Chico Aura Dwi Wardoyo of Indonesia. He then lost to Thailand's Kunlavut Vitidsarn in the semifinals, in straight games, 11–21, 12–21, thus ending up with the joint bronze medal.

At the 2022 Commonwealth Games, Teh won the bronze medal in the mixed team event as the Singaporean team finished as bronze medalists at the event after defeating England 3–0.

A few days after the Mixed team event, Teh took part in the  Men's singles as the 7th seed. Teh lost to Srikanth Kidambi in the bronze medal match, losing 15–21, 18–21 in straight games. Teh finished 4th place overall.

Personal life
Teh served his National Service (NS) for the Singapore Armed Forces (SAF) immediately after secondary school education, forgoing tertiary education in the process, as he wanted to play badminton full-time for Singapore.

Achievements

Southeast Asian Games 
Men's singles

BWF International Challenge/Series (2 runners-up) 
Men's singles

  BWF International Challenge tournament
  BWF International Series tournament

References

External links 
 
 Jason Teh at Singapore Badminton Association

2000 births
Living people
Singaporean people of Chinese descent
Singapore Sports School alumni
Singaporean male badminton players
Badminton players at the 2022 Commonwealth Games
Commonwealth Games bronze medallists for Singapore
Commonwealth Games medallists in badminton
Competitors at the 2021 Southeast Asian Games
Southeast Asian Games bronze medalists for Singapore
Southeast Asian Games medalists in badminton
Medallists at the 2022 Commonwealth Games